The School of Physics is a constituent body of the Faculty of Science at the University of Sydney, Australia.

History
Physics was first taught at the tertiary level in Australia at the University of Sydney, beginning in 1852. After the establishment of the Faculty of Science in 1882, the School was established as a distinct entity within the Faculty. The school offers research in a wide range of areas in physics covering the spectrum from theoretical and applied physics.

References

External links

 School of Physics at the Faculty of Science, University of Sydney

Physics, School of